Chloanohieris is a genus of moths belonging to the family Tortricidae.

Species
Chloanohieris comastes Diakonoff, 1989

See also
List of Tortricidae genera

References

 , 2005: World catalogue of insects volume 5 Tortricidae.
 , 1989, Annls Soc. ent. Fr. (N.S.) 25: 432.
 , 2011: Diagnoses and remarks on genera of Tortricidae, 2: Cochylini (Lepidoptera: Tortricidae). Shilap Revista de Lepidopterologia 39 (156): 397–414.

External links
tortricidae.com

Cochylini
Tortricidae genera